The culture of Myanmar (also known as Burma) has been heavily influenced by Buddhism. Burmese culture has also been influenced by its neighbours.

In more recent times, British colonial rule and easternisation have influenced aspects of Burmese culture, including language and education.

Arts

Historically, Burmese art was based on Buddhist or Hindu 
myths. There are several regional styles of Buddha images, each with certain distinctive characteristics. For example, the Mandalay style, which developed in the late 1800s, consists of an oval-shaped Buddha with realistic features, including naturally curved eyebrows, smaller but still prominent ears, and a draping robe. There are 10 traditional arts, called pan sè myo, listed as follows:

 Blacksmith ( ba-bè)
 Woodcarving ( ba-bu)
 Goldsmith ( ba-dein)
 Stucco relief ( pandaw)
 Masonry ( pa-yan)
 Stone carving ( pantamaw)
 Turnery ( panbut)
 Painting ( bagyi)
 Lacquerware ( panyun)
 Bronze casting ( badin)

In addition to the traditional arts are silk weaving, pottery, tapestry making, gemstone engraving, and gold leaf making. Temple architecture is typically of brick and stucco, and pagodas are often covered with layers of gold leaf while monasteries tend to be built of wood (although monasteries in cities are more likely to be built of modern materials). A very common roofing style in Burmese architecture is called pyatthat, which is a many tiered and spired roof.

Literature

Buddhism, notably the Jataka Tales, has greatly influenced Burmese literature. Many historical works are nonfiction. However, British colonization introduced many genres of fiction, which have become extremely popular today. Poetry features prominently, and there are several forms of poetry unique to Burmese literature. By 1976, only 411 titles were published annually, compared to 1882, when 445 titles were published. Various factors, especially the lengthened bureaucratic process to obtain printing permits, censorship, and increasing economic hardship of consumers because of the socialist economic schemes, contributed to the decline of Burmese literary output.

Popular novels have similar themes to Western novels, often involving adventure, espionage, detective work, and romance. Many writers also translate Western novels, especially those of Arthur Hailey and Harold Robbins. The flourishing translation sector is the result of the Burmese government, which did not sign the Universal Copyright Convention Agreement, which would have forced Burmese writers to pay royalties to the original writers.

Short stories, often published in magazines, also enjoy tremendous popularity. They often deal with everyday life and have political messages (such as subtle criticisms of the capitalist system), partly because, unlike novels, short stories are not censored by the Press Scrutiny Board. Poetry is also a popular genre today, as it was during the monarchical times. However, unlike novels and other works, which use literary Burmese, poetry uses vernacular rather than literary Burmese. This reform movement is led by left-leaning writers who believe laymen's language (the vernacular and colloquial form of Burmese) should be used instead of formal Burmese in literature.

One of the greatest female writers of the Post-colonial period is Journal Kyaw Ma Ma Lay. Khin Myo Chit was another important writer who wrote, among her works, The 13-Carat Diamond (1955), which was translated into many languages. The journalist Ludu U Hla was the author of numerous volumes of ethnic minority folklore, novels about inmates in U Nu-era jails, and biographies of people working in different occupations. Prime Minister U Nu himself wrote several politically oriented plays and novels.

Other prolific writers of the post-colonial era include Thein Phae Myint (and his The Ocean Traveller and the Pearl Queen, considered a Burmese classic), Mya Than Tint (known for his translations of Western classics like War and Peace), Thawda Swe and Myat Htun. Distinguished women writers, who have also been an ever-present force in Burmese literary history, include Kyi Aye, Khin Hnin Yu, and San San Nweh. Burmese Historians: Ba Shin, Than Tun, Thant Myint-U, Htin Aung, Sao Saimong, Myoma Myint Kywe, and San C. Po were famous in Burma.

Dance

Dance in Burma can be divided into dramatic, folk and village, and nat dances, each having distinct characteristics. Although Burmese dance has been influenced by the dance traditions., is also popular in Myanmar, Yodaya is the named that was given by Burmese for Thailand.

Music

Various types of Burmese music use an array of traditional musical instruments, assembled in an orchestra known as hsaing waing which the Burmese saing saya Kyaw Kyaw Naing has made more widely known in the West. Traditional folk music is atypical in Southeast Asian music, as it is characterised by sudden shifts in rhythm and melody as well as change in texture and timbre. An instrument unique to Burma is the saung-gauk, an arched harp that can be traced to pre-Hittite times.

Classical traditions of Burmese music are found in the Mahagita, an extensive collection of classical songs and are typically divided into indoor and outdoor ensembles. These songs tend to be about various legends in Pali and subsequently in Burmese intermingled with Pali, related to religion or the power and glory of monarchs, and then the natural beauty of the land, forests and the seasons, eventually feminine beauty, love, passion and longing, in addition to folk music sung in the paddy fields. Pop music, both adopted and homegrown, however, dominates the music of Burma today.

Customs

The "traditional" Burmese greeting is mingalaba (from Pali  and roughly translated as 'auspiciousness to you'). This is, however, a comparatively recent form of greeting, first emerging during British rule in Burma during the 19th to 20th centuries, coined as a Burmese language equivalent to 'hello' or 'how are you.' More informal rhetorical greetings such as "Have you eaten?" ( Htamin sa pi bi la) and "How are you?" ( Nei kaung la) are still common. "Hello" is also a popular greeting nowadays, whereas it used to be confined to answering the phone.

Clothing

This replaced the traditional paso for men and tamein for women by the 20th century. For business and formal occasions, Bamar men wear a Manchu Chinese jacket over an English collar shirt (sometimes donning a turban called gaung baung), while Bamar women wear a blouse buttoned at the front, called  or to the side, called , and a shawl. In urban areas, skirts and pants are becoming more common, particularly among the young.

During the British colonial era, Burmese nationalists associated traditional clothing, in particular Yaw longyi, a type of longyi from the Yaw region, and pinni taikpon, a fawn-coloured collarless jacket, with anti-colonialism and nationalist sentiment, because of a clampdown in the 1920s over increasing dissent. Wearing "traditional" clothing was seen as a mode of passive resistance among the Burmese. British rule nonetheless influenced hair fashion and clothing. Cropped short hair, called bo ke replaced long hair as the norm among Burmese men.

Similarly, women began wearing hairstyles like amauk, consisting of crested bangs curled at the top, with the traditional hair bun. The female sarong (htamein) became shorter, no longer extending to the feet, but to the ankles, and the length of the sarong's top decreased to reveal more waistline. This period also saw the introduction of a sheer muslin blouse for women, revealing a corset-like lace bodice called za bawli.

Speech
The Burmese language is very age-oriented. The use of honorifics before personal names is the norm, and it is considered rude to call a person just by their name without the honorific unless they are known from childhood or youth or in the case of a younger underling. Young males are addressed as Maung or Ko (lit. brother), and older or senior men as U (lit. uncle). Likewise, young females are addressed as Ma (lit. sister), and older or senior women as Daw (lit. aunt), regardless of their marital status. 'Aunty' or 'Uncle' is commonly used as well today. The first and second person pronouns vary depending on whom one is speaking to and are age-dependent. Elders are spoken to in a more respectful manner and a special vocabulary exists for speaking to Buddhist monks.

Manners

Burmese society operates on ana, a characteristic or feeling that has no English equivalent. It is characterised by a hesitation, reluctance or avoidance, to perform an action based on the fear that it will offend someone or cause someone to lose face, or become embarrassed. Also, there is the concept of hpon (from Sanskrit bhaga), which translates to "power". It is used as an explanation for the varying degrees of ethnic, socioeconomic, and gender differences between people in a society. Hpon refers to the cumulative result of past deeds, an idea that power or social position comes from merit earned in previous lives. This idea is used to justify the prevalent view that women are lesser than men, who are considered to have more hpon.

Age is still considered synonymous with experience and wisdom, hence venerated. Parents and teachers are second only to the Three Jewels ( yadana thoun ba), together making up the Five Boundless Beneficence ( ananda nga ba), and are paid obeisance (called gadaw) at special times of the year such as Thingyan, beginning and end of Buddhist Lent, and usually parents before one leaves on a journey. Elders are served first at meals, and in their absence a spoonful of rice is put aside first in the pot as a token of respect ( u cha) before serving the meal. Young people would avoid sitting on a higher level than the elders or passing in front of them unless unavoidable, and then only treading softly with a slight bow. Things would be passed to the elders using both hands together. Men may cross their legs sitting on a chair or a mat but women generally would not.

Children are taught from young 'to venerate one's elders, to respect one's peers, and to be kind to the young and weak'. Parents are believed to be solely responsible for their children's behaviour as reflected by the expressions:  ( undisciplined either by mother or by father) and ami youk tau hnoukkyan, ahpa youk tau ko amu-aya kyan (bad language from bad mother, bad body-language from bad father). Saying "thank you" however is not Burmese custom between friends and within the family.

It is considered rude to touch a person's head, because it is the "highest" point of the body. It is also considered taboo to touch another's feet, but worse still to point with the foot or sit with feet pointing at someone older, because the feet are considered the lowest. Also, pointing a finger at Buddha images is considered blasphemous, although this custom has slowly eroded. Shoes are always taken off upon entering homes, monasteries and pagoda compounds. A custom of the Burmese is to perambulate clockwise ( let ya yit) around a pagoda, not counterclockwise ( let wè yit).

Physical demonstrations of affection in public are common between friends of the same gender or between members of the family, but seldom seen between lovers. It is thus common to see friends walking together holding hands or with arms round each other, but couples rarely do so, except in major cities.

Footwear 

In Myanmar, footwear is customarily removed before entering a home and Buddhist places of worship. Many workplaces in Myanmar also have shoe-free areas, or restrict footwear altogether, with shoes typically left at the corridor or at the entrance of an office.

These customs are strictly enforced in Buddhist places of worship, including Burmese pagodas and in Buddhist monasteries called kyaung. The Burmese remove their footwear at such sites as a sign of religious respect.

Strict enforcement of this custom, however, is partly a legacy of British rule in Burma, during which Europeans refused and were exempted from removing their footwear when entering Buddhist places of worship. In pre-colonial Burma, non-royals removed their footwear before entering palace grounds, as a token of respect for the reigning monarch. In the final years of the Konbaung dynasty, diplomatic relations between the British and Burmese soured when the British Resident, a colonial representative, refused to remove his shoes upon entering the raised platform of the Mandalay Palace, a decision that prevented him from meeting King Thibaw Min. Consequently, the British withdrew the Resident and his delegation in October 1879, with his exit portending the Third Anglo-Burmese War, after which the remaining half of the Burmese kingdom (Upper Burma) was fully annexed into British India.

This "shoe question" became a rallying cry for Burmese nationalists, comparable to the cow protection movement in neighboring British India. In 1916, the nationalist Young Men's Buddhist Association (YMBA) began campaigning against foreigners wearing shoes in pagoda grounds, with Buddhist monks at the forefront of the campaign. The Ledi Sayadaw, a prominent Buddhist monk, penned On the Impropriety of Wearing Shoes on Pagoda Platforms, which drew in widespread support for the YMBA's activism.

In 1919, after a two-year battle, Cambridge-educated barrister, Thein Maung, a YMBA member, successfully persuaded the colonial government to issue an order prohibiting footwear on the grounds of religious sites. Thein Maung's undertaking was in direct response to the actions of Archibald Cochrane, future Governor of Burma, who had kept his shoes on while touring Shwemawdaw Pagoda in Pegu (now Bago) in 1917, much to the indignation of locals.

In recent years, foreigners have been successfully prosecuted and punished for refusing to remove their footwear at Burmese religious sites. In August 2017, a Russian tourist was arrested and sentenced to seven months of jail time and hard labor for repeatedly refusing to remove her shoes upon entering pagoda grounds throughout Bagan, as she had violated local customs, per Section 13(1) of the Immigration Act. Burmese authorities subsequently announced a crackdown tourists wearing shoes inside Bagan's pagodas.

Cuisine

Burmese cuisine has been influenced by Indian, Chinese and Thai cuisines as well as domestic ethnic cuisines. It is not widely known throughout the world and can be characterised as having a mildly spicy taste, with a limited use of spices. A typical Burmese meal consists of several Burmese curries, a soup, steamed rice and fermented sauce of preserved fish, along with vegetables for dipping. Condiments like balachaung, Indian-style pickles and pickled vegetables are commonly served alongside the dishes. Although fish sauce and shrimp paste are commonly used ingredients, as in other Southeast Asian cuisines, Burmese cuisine also makes extensive use of chickpeas, lentils and tamarind, which is used to add a sour flavour rather than the lime juice or vinegar used in other cuisines.

Ethnic cuisines, in particular Shan cuisine, are also prominently found throughout Burma, as are Indian and Chinese dishes, particularly in urban areas. The de facto national dish is mohinga, rice noodles in a rich fish soup. Burmese salads, especially laphet thoke, which is a salad of pickled tea leaves, are also popular dishes. The Burmese traditionally eat with their fingers, although the usage of Western utensils and chopsticks have become more widespread, especially in towns and cities. Indian breads like paratha and naan or rice noodles are also commonly eaten with dishes, in addition to rice.

Weddings

Weddings are considered one of the Twelve Auspicious Rites in Burmese culture. Traditional Burmese folklore considers love to be destiny, as the Hindu god Brahma writes one's destiny in love on a child's brow when he or she is six days old, called na hpuza (lit. "destiny on the forehead"). A Burmese wedding can be religious or secular and extravagant or simple. Traditionally, a marriage is recognised with or without a ceremony when the man's longyi (sarong) is seen hanging from a rail of the house or if the couple eats from the same plate. Dowries are typically unheard of, and arranged marriage is not a custom of the common Burmese.

Weddings are traditionally avoided during the Buddhist lent, which lasts three months from July to October.

Generally speaking, Buddhist monks are not present to conduct the wedding and solemnise the marriage, as they are forbidden to officiate a marriage, which is considered a worldly affair. However, they may be invited to bless the newly wed couple and recite a protective paritta. Typically, the bride and groom arrange an almsgiving feast to monks the morning of the wedding to gain merit.

A more extravagant wedding requires months of preparation, including consultation with an astrologer in choosing the most auspicious time and setting of the event. Also, a master of ceremonies, typically a brahmin, is hired to preside over the ceremony. The bride and groom sit on cushions next to each other. At the beginning of the wedding, the Brahmin blows a conch shell to commence the ceremony and joins the palms of the couple, wraps them in white cloth, and dips the joined palms in a silver bowl. The Burmese word "to marry" is let htat, which literally means "to join palms together". After chanting a few Sanskrit mantras, the brahmin takes the couple's joined palms out of the bowl and blows the conch shell to end the ceremony. Afterward, entertainers perform, and the wedding is ended with a speech by a guest of higher social standing. Wedding receptions at a hotel, serving tea and ice cream, are common in urban areas.

Funerals

Burmese funerals typically last a week, with the body traditionally buried or cremated on the third day. Burial is common, but cremation, more common in the cities, is also practised by orthodox Buddhists and monks in Burma. A coin, called kudoga is placed in the mouth of the deceased person, to pay a "ferry toll" for crossing death. Before the actual interment of the body, an offering of turmeric-coated rice is given to appease the bhummazo, the guardian deity of the earth. During the actual funeral, gifts in the form of paper fans containing the deceased person's name, as well as Buddhist scriptures relating to the impermanence of life (anicca) and samsara are distributed to all attendees.

In urban areas, flower wreaths and florals are typically given at a funeral, as well as money, for less well-to-do families. However, in villages, more practical gifts such as food items are given to the grieving family. For seven days, the windows and doors of the house in which the person died may be left open, to let the deceased person's consciousness or "spirit", called  leave the home, and a vigil may be kept at nighttime. On the seventh day, called , a meal is offered to monks, who in turn recite blessings, protective parittas and transfer merit to the deceased, concluded with a Buddhist water libation ceremony.

Religion

Myanmar is a predominantly Theravada Buddhist country. Buddhism reached Burma around the beginning of the Christian era, mingling with indigenous form of Hinduism. The Pyu and Mon kingdoms of the first millennium were Hindu-Buddhist. According to traditional history, King Anawrahta of Bagan adopted Buddhism in 1056 and went to war with the Mon kingdom of Thaton in the south of the country to obtain the Buddhist Canon and learned monks. The religious tradition created at this time, and which continues to the present day, is a syncretic mix of what might be termed 'pure' Buddhism (of the Theravada school) with deep-rooted elements of the original Hindu-animist culture or nat worship and even strands of Hinduism and the Mahayana tradition of northern India.

Islam reached Burma at approximately the same time, but never gained a foothold outside the geographically isolated seaboard running from modern-day Bangladesh southward to Irrawaddy Delta (modern Rakhine State, formerly Arakan, an independent kingdom until the eighteenth century). The colonial period saw a huge influx of Muslim Indians into Yangon and other cities, and the majority of Yangon's many mosques owe their origins to these immigrants.

Christianity was brought to Burma by European missionaries in the 1800s. It made little headway among Buddhists, but has been widely adopted by non-Buddhists such as the Chin, Karen, and Kachin. The Roman Catholic Church, Myanmar Baptist Convention and the Assemblies of God of Burma are the largest Christian denominations in Burma. Burma is home to the second largest population of Baptists in the world, after the United States, the result of American missionary work.

The Chinese contribution to Burma's religious mix has been slight, but several traditional Chinese temples were established in Yangon and other large cities in the nineteenth century when large-scale Chinese migration was encouraged by the British. Since approximately 1990 this migration has resumed in huge numbers, but the modern Chinese immigrants seem to have little interest in religion. Some more isolated indigenous peoples in the more inaccessible parts of the country still follow traditional animism.

Burma has nominal guarantees of freedom of religious expression, although religious minorities (Christians and Muslims), particularly those in the countryside are subject to discrimination. Sporadic riots between Burmese Buddhists and Burmese Muslims are not uncommon, and tensions between the two religious groups are high, particularly in major cities. In 2001, after the Taliban's destruction of the Buddhas of Bamiyan in Afghanistan, religiously motivated riots broke out between Buddhists and Muslims across major cities in Burma, including Sittwe, Pyay, Taungoo and Bago. The current regime's nationalistic policy of Bama san-gyin, which considers Buddhism a key element of Burmese-ness, does provide a systemic bias in favour of Buddhists in terms of preferment in the armed forces and other State structures.

Pagodas and monasteries 

Aspects of Burmese culture are most apparent at religious sites. The country has been called the "Land of Pagodas" as the landscape is dominated by Buddhist pagodas or stupas. The four most important Burmese Buddhist pilgrimage sites are Shwedagon Pagoda in Yangon, Mahamuni Buddha in Mandalay, Kyaiktiyo Pagoda in Mon State, and Bagan, an ancient capital by the Ayeyarwaddy River where thousands of stupas and temples have stood for nearly a millennium in various states of repair .

Traditional festivals 

There are twelve months in the traditional Burmese calendar and twelve corresponding festivals. Most of the festivals are related to Burmese Buddhism and in any town or village the local paya pwè (the pagoda festival) is the most important one.

The most well-known festival is Thingyan, a four-day celebration of the coming Lunar New Year. This festival is held prior to the Burmese New Year, the first day of Tagu which falls in mid-April. It is related and similar to other Southeast Asian New Year festivals (Songkran, Cambodian New Year, Sinhalese New Year and Lao New Year), people splash water on one another. However, Thingyan has religious significance, marking the days in which Buddhists are expected to observe the Eight Precepts of Buddhism.

Sports

Football
Football is the most popular sport in Myanmar. Similar to football, chinlone is an indigenous sport that utilises a rattan ball and is played using mainly the feet and the knees, but the head and also the arms may be used except the hands.

Lethwei
Lethwei, or Burmese bareknuckle boxing, is the most popular combat sport in Myanmar. It is a Burmese full-contact martial art called thaing, divided into bando (unarmed combat) and banshay (armed combat).

Regatta
Of the twelve seasonal festivals, regattas are held in the month of Tawthalin (August/September). The term typically describes racing events of rowed or sailed water craft.

Equestrian
Equestrian events were held by the royal army in the time of the Burmese kings in the month of Pyatho (December/January).

Cricket
During British rule, the game of cricket was played by the ruling British, with the Burma national cricket team playing a number of first-class matches. The team exists today, although no longer of first-class quality and is an affiliate member of the International Cricket Council.

Basketball
Burma also has a basketball team, which qualified for the Asian Games in the past.

National holidays

See also
 Bamar culture
 Burmese Buddhist titles
 Burmese names
 Monastic examinations
 Monastic schools in Myanmar
 Mythical creatures in Burmese folklore
 Satuditha
 University of Culture, Mandalay
 University of Culture, Yangon
 List of museums in Burma

References

External links 
 Burmese Literature inc. audio
 An Introduction to Burmese Sculpture
 The Exquisite Art of Wood Carving by Pyi Phone Myint
 Burmese Festivals
 Mystic Ball - the Movie (Chinlon)
 Social and Arts Trend Changes in Burma BBC Burmese Highlights: Year-end Specials 2006
 Living and Learning English in Mandalay
 Lethwei

 

pt:Myanmar#Cultura